Milovan Đorić (Serbian Cyrillic: Милован Ђорић; born 6 August 1945) is a Serbian football manager and former player. He is often referred to by his nickname Bata Đora.

Đorić last coached in 2011 when he was head coach of the Serbia U17 national team. He resigned after public outrage at Serbia bowing out in the group stage of that year's under-17 championship.

Playing career
He made his professional debut in 1967 with Red Star Belgrade, where he remained for six seasons winning four championships and two cups.

At the beginning of the 1973–74 season, Đorić was transferred to Real Oviedo of Spain, where he finished his career in 1975.

Quotes
"When I left Red Star, I went hunting – for money. I was like a kamikaze."
"I get angry easily and am a 'fast' person."
"All the money I earn in football, I invest out of football."

References

External links
 

1945 births
Living people
Sportspeople from Užice
Yugoslav footballers
Association football defenders
FK Sloboda Užice players
Red Star Belgrade footballers
Real Oviedo players
Yugoslav First League players
La Liga players
Yugoslavia international footballers
Yugoslav expatriate footballers
Yugoslav expatriate sportspeople in Spain
Expatriate footballers in Spain
Yugoslav football managers
Serbia and Montenegro football managers
Serbian football managers
FK Čukarički managers
FK Napredak Kruševac managers
FK Sutjeska Nikšić managers
FC Prishtina managers
El Salvador national football team managers
FK Budućnost Podgorica managers
FK Radnički Niš managers
FK Borac Čačak managers
C.D. Águila managers
Beijing Guoan F.C. managers
Red Star Belgrade non-playing staff
Serbia and Montenegro national football team managers
Yugoslav expatriate football managers
Yugoslav expatriate sportspeople in El Salvador
Serbia and Montenegro expatriate football managers
Serbia and Montenegro expatriate sportspeople in El Salvador
Serbia and Montenegro expatriate sportspeople in China
Expatriate football managers in El Salvador
Expatriate football managers in China